Winkia neuii is a species of Gram-positive, rod-shaped bacteria within the genus Winkia. It is known to live commensally on and within humans as part of normal, healthy microbiota of the human vagina

References

External links
Type strain of Actinomyces neuii at BacDive -  the Bacterial Diversity Metadatabase

Actinomycetales
Gram-positive bacteria
Bacteria described in 1995